Al Shaqab station is a station on the Doha Metro's Green Line. Contrary to its name, the station is located on Huwar Street in Old Al Rayyan, but is near the border with Al Shaqab (also spelled "Al Shagub"). It serves the municipality of Al Rayyan, specifically Education City, Al Shaqab, Old Al Rayyan, Al Luqta and the suburb of Ain Al Rakheesa.

The station currently has no metrolinks. Facilities on the premises include restrooms and a prayer room.

History
The station was opened to the public on 10 December, 2019 along with the other stations of the Green Line, which is also known as the Education Line.

Connections
It is served by bus routes 42, 45 and 57.

Station Layout

References

Doha Metro stations
2019 establishments in Qatar
Railway stations opened in 2019